Elizabeth Bailey O'Bagy (born 1987) is foreign policy advisor. She was previously a senior analyst at the Institute for the Study of War, where she was terminated in 2013 for allegedly misrepresenting her credentials.

Early life and education
O'Bagy is originally from Holladay, Utah, a Salt Lake City suburb, and a 2005 graduate of Olympus High School. O'Bagy attended Georgetown University and earned a B.A. in 2009 in Arabic from Georgetown College and M.A. in 2013, in Arab studies from the Center for Contemporary Arab Studies.

Career
Described as a "Syria researcher" in 2013, O'Bagy, who had previously written for The Atlantic, contributed an op-ed to The Wall Street Journal that was cited by U.S. Secretary of State John Kerry and Senator John McCain during a U.S. Senate hearing to support possible United States military intervention into the Syrian civil war. At the time of the hearing, O'Bagy had been identified as "Dr. O'Bagy" by the Institute for the Study of War, where she was an analyst. Following the hearing, however, the Institute for the Study of War terminated O'Bagy, posting a statement to its website that read "Elizabeth O'Bagy does not in fact have a Ph.D. degree from Georgetown University" as, according to the institute, she had previously represented to institute officials.

In the Wall Street Journal op-ed she wrote, O'Bagy also omitted her affiliation with the Syrian Emergency Task Force, a U.S.-based group that supports and lobbies for the Syrian opposition, which received criticism. In her work with that group she advocated for the US government to send heavy weaponry to support Syrian rebels.

Two weeks after her dismissal from the Institute for the Study of War, O'Bagy was hired as a legislative assistant by U.S. Senator John McCain. In June 2022, she was hired by U.S. Senator Chris Coons as a "senior foreign policy advisor."

References

2013 hoaxes
People of the Syrian civil war
Foreign policy of the Barack Obama administration
Place of birth missing (living people)
Legislative staff
United States congressional aides
1987 births
Living people
People who fabricated academic degrees
People from Holladay, Utah
Georgetown College (Georgetown University) alumni